Javier Modrego Casado (also known as ‘Modre’) (born 19 January 1988 in Soria, Castile and León, Spain) is a retired Spanish footballer who played as a midfielder. He is now the coach of the main team of C. D. San José De Soria and he also works as director of the children's soccer campuses in Soria.

Honours
Spain U19
UEFA U-19 Championship: 2007

External links

1988 births
Living people
People from Soria
Sportspeople from the Province of Soria
Spanish footballers
Footballers from Castile and León
Association football midfielders
Segunda División players
Segunda División B players
Real Valladolid Promesas players
Real Madrid Castilla footballers
Getafe CF B players
Villarreal CF B players
CF Rayo Majadahonda players
Spain youth international footballers